Monte Stella is a mountain the Lucan Subappennines, with an elevation of 1,131 m, located in Cilento, Campania, southern Italy.

Geography
At his slopes there are located the villages of Serramezzana, San Mauro Cilento, Galdo (hamlet of Pollica), Amalafede, San Giovanni, Guarrazzano, Stella Cilento, Omignano, Sessa Cilento, Castagneto, San Mango Cilento, Mercato Cilento and Perdifumo.

On the summit is a radar station and the "Madonna del Monte Stella" church.

Pictures

See also
Gelbison
Cervati
Alburni
Apennine Mountains

References

External links

Mountains of Campania
Cilento